

Events
January 1 – Julius Friedländer buys the Leipzig music publishing house, CF Peters.
February 9 – The second "Querelle des Bouffons" is sparked when Hector Berlioz criticizes Richard Wagner's music in the Journal des débats.  Wagner responds on February 15.
February 10 – The Serenade No. 2 in A, Op. 16 by Johannes Brahms is given its first public performance in Hamburg.
March 3 – The Serenade No. 1 in D, Op. 11 by Johannes Brahms is given its first public performance in Hanover.
April 9 – Édouard-Léon Scott de Martinville records himself singing "Au Clair de la Lune" – the first known recording of the human voice.
May 4 – Charles Bacon's bronze statue of the late Felix Mendelssohn is unveiled at Crystal Palace in London.
September 14 – Franz Liszt makes a will.
October 22 – The city of Weimar pays tribute to Franz Liszt with a torchlight procession and honorary citizenship.
 The first Viennese operetta, Das Pensionat by Franz von Suppé, is premièred at the Theater an der Wien.
 Richard Wagner essay on "Music of the Future" is first published, in French translation.
 First official National Eisteddfod of Wales is held at Denbigh.

Published popular music
 "Dixie" by Dan Emmett
 "Down Among the Cane-Brakes" by Stephen Foster
 "Kalinka" by Ivan Larionov
 "Lincoln and Liberty" words by Jesse Hutchinson, Jr.
 "Mary Of Argyle" words by Charles Jefferys, music by Sidney Nelson
 "Old Black Joe" by Stephen Foster
 "Virginia Belle" by Stephen Foster
 "When the Corn Is Waving, Annie Dear" by Charles Blamphin
 "I'll Twine 'Mid the Ringlets" words by Maud Irving, music by Joseph Philbrick Webster

Classical music
Johannes Brahms
Vier Gesänge, for women's chorus, two horns and harp, Op. 17
String Sextet No. 1 in B-flat major, Op. 18
Karl Davydov – Fantasie über russische Lieder, Op.7
Eduard Franck 
Piano Trio No.2 in E♭ major, Op.22
Violin Sonata No.2, Op.23
Joseph Mikel – Les lanciers aux bains de mer
Louis Moreau Gottschalk – Jeunesse, Op.70
Franz Liszt – First of the Mephisto Waltzes
John Knowles Paine – Concert Variations on the Austrian Hymn in F for Organ (Op.3, No.1)
Anton Rubinstein – Soirées à Saint-Pétersbourg
Camille Saint-Saëns 
Symphony No.2, Op.55
Ave Maria

Opera
Gaetano Donizetti – Rita, ou Le mari battu (Posthumously discovered, premiered, and published)
Flor van Duyse – Teniers te Grimbergen (libretto by Prudens van Duyse, premiered at Ghent)
Charles Gounod – La colombe, premiered August 3 in Baden-Baden
Stanislaw Moniuszko – Hrabina
Jacques Offenbach 
Barkouf
Le carnaval des revues

Musical theater
 Orphée Aux Enfers, Vienna production

Births
January 7 – Emanuil Manolov, Bulgarian composer (d. 1902)
January 24 – Philippe Bellenot, composer (died 1928)
March 13 – Hugo Wolf, composer (d. 1903)
May 5 – Pietro Floridia, composer (d. 1932)
May 17 – August Stradal, pianist (died 1930)
May 29 – Isaac Albéniz, pianist and composer (d. 1909)
June 25 – Gustave Charpentier, composer (d. 1956)
July 7
Florence Farr, actress and composer (d. 1917)
Gustav Mahler, conductor and composer (d. 1911)
September 1 – Cleofonte Campanini, conductor (d. 1919)
September 18 – Alberto Franchetti, opera composer (d. 1942)
November 18 – Ignacy Jan Paderewski, pianist (d. 1941)
November 27 – Victor Ewald, composer (d. 1935)
December 4 – Lillian Russell, US singer and actress (d. 1922)
December 18 – Edward MacDowell, pianist and composer (d. 1908)
December 20 – Dan Leno, English music hall comedian, dancer and singer (d. 1904)
December 24 – Julius Korngold, music critic (died 1945)
December 28 – Harry B. Smith, US songwriter (d. 1936)
December 30 – Thomas Bulch, brass-band composer (d. 1930)

Deaths
January 26 – Wilhelmine Schröder-Devrient, opera singer (b. 1804)
February 24 – James Barr, composer (born 1779)
March 6 – Justus Johann Friedrich Dotzauer, French cellist and composer (b. 1783)
March 14 – Louis Antoine Jullien, conductor and composer (b. 1812)
May 21 – Johannes Frederik Fröhlich, violinist, conductor and composer (b. 1806)
June 21 – Mykola Markevych, musician, composer and poet (b. 1804)
 10 August – Sara Augusta Malmborg, singer, pianist and painter (b. 1810)
August 26 – Friedrich Silcher, composer (b. 1789)
September 25 – Carl Friedrich Zöllner, composer and choirmaster (b. 1800)
November 27 – Ludwig Rellstab, critic (b. 1799)
date unknown
James Barr, composer (b. 1779)
Veena Kuppayyar, composer of Carnatic music (b. 1798)

References

 
19th century in music
Music by year